William Ghosh (9 November 1928 – 26 June 1993) was an Indian cricketer who played first-class cricket from 1949 to 1968.

Ghosh was a left-arm spin bowler who took 239 first-class wickets at 19.77, playing for various teams in the north of India. He twice appeared in Test trials, but did not play Test cricket. His best innings bowling figures were 6 for 35 in 1953-54. He took his best match figures of 10 for 65 (5 for 33 and 5 for 32) when he captained Railways to victory over Southern Punjab in 1966-67.

References

External links
 
 William Ghosh at CricketArchive

1928 births
1993 deaths
Indian cricketers
Cricketers from Jalandhar
Railways cricketers
Eastern Punjab cricketers
Indian Starlets cricketers
North Zone cricketers